Let It Rain may refer to:

Films
 Let It Rain (1927 film), featuring Boris Karloff
 Let It Rain (2008 film), a French film

Music

Albums
 Let It Rain (Montell Jordan album), 2008
 Let It Rain (Shirley Myers album), 1997
 Let It Rain (Tracy Chapman album), 2002

Songs
 "Let It Rain" (Eric Clapton song), 1972
 "Let It Rain" (East 17 song), 1994
 "Let It Rain" (Amanda Marshall song), 1995
 "Let It Rain" (Mark Chesnutt song), 1996
 "Let It Rain" (Shirley Myers song), 1997
 "Let It Rain" (BWO song), 2007
 "Let It Rain" (David Nail song), 2011
 "Let It Rain" (Tinchy Stryder song), 2011
 "Let It Rain" (Eliza Doolittle song), 2013
 "Let It Rain (Is There Anybody)", a song by Crowder featuring Mandisa, 2010
 "Let It Rain", a song by The Boys (English band), 1981
 "Let It Rain", a song by Billy Joe Royal from his 1987 album The Royal Treatment
 "Let It Rain", a song by Girls' Generation from their 2011 Japanese album Girls' Generation
 "Let It Rain", a song by Gotthard from their 1998 album Open
 "Let It Rain", a song by Heavy D & the Boyz from their 1991 album Peaceful Journey
 "Let It Rain", a song by Jennifer Paige from her 1998 album Jennifer Paige
 "Let It Rain", a song by JoJo from her 2006 album The High Road
 "Let it Rain", a song by Jon Bon Jovi and Luciano Pavarotti from the album Pavarotti & Friends for the Children of Liberia
 "Let It Rain", a song by Jordin Sparks from her 2009 album Battlefield
 "Let It Rain", a song by Kris Allen from his 2009 album Kris Allen
 "Let It Rain", a song by Leona Lewis from her 2009 single "Happy"
 "Let It Rain", a song by Michael W. Smith from his 2001 album Worship
 "Let It Rain", a song by Nana from his 1997 album Nana
 "Let It Rain", a song by OK Go from their 2005 album Oh No
 "Let It Rain", a song by Sarah Brightman from her 2009 album Symphony 
 "Let It Rain", a song by Take That performed on their 2006 Ultimate Tour
 "Let It Rain", a song by UFO from their 1982 album Mechanix
 "Let It Rain", a song by 4 Strings that was released as a charting single in 2003
 "Let It Rain", a song from My Little Pony: Equestria Girls

See also
Make It Rain (disambiguation)